Ernest Abuba (August 25, 1947 – June 21, 2022) was a Filipino-American actor, playwright, director and co-founder of the Pan Asian Repertory Theatre. He appeared on stage and on film, with more than one hundred stage appearances.

Early life 
Born in Honolulu, Abuba was raised in San Diego and Texas.

Career 
Abuba received an Obie Award in 1983 for his portrayal of Kenji Kadota in Yellow Fever. His Broadway credits include: Pacific Overtures, Loose Ends, Zoya's Apartment, and Lincoln Center Theatre's  The Oldest Boy, which was his final Broadway role. Among the highlights of his long Off-Broadway career is that he was the first Asian-American in the role of Sakini in Teahouse of the August Moon, and the first Asian-American as MacBeth in Shogun Macbeth. On screen he was known for 12 Monkeys, Call Me, Forever Lulu and many more roles. 
As a playwright, he was known for 2013's Dojoji. 

Abuba was on the theatre faculty at Sarah Lawrence College.

Personal life 
Abuba and Tisa Chang married in 1976 and had one son before divorcing. Abuba died in New York City on June 21, 2022.

Filmography

Film

Television

References

1947 births
2022 deaths
American people of Filipino descent
21st-century American actors
Obie Award recipients
People from Honolulu